() is an Arabic Islamic term referring to the custom, or 'knowledge', of a given society. To be recognized in an Islamic society,  must be compatible with the Sharia law.

 is a source of Islamic legal rulings where there are not explicit primary texts of the Qur'an and Sunnah specifying the ruling.  can also specify something generally established in the primary texts.

Overview
Terminology
The term , meaning "to know", refers to the customs and practices of a given society. 

History
Later al-Sarak̲h̲sī (d. 483/1090) opposed it, holding that custom cannot prevail over a written text.

Scriptural basis
The "maxim" that custom is an authoritative source for Islamic law "appears in the Quran and Hadith". One hadith narrated by Ibn Mas'ud stated 'Whatever the Muslim saw as good is [considered] good by God, and whatever the Muslim saw as evil is evil according to God.'"

Sharia
Although this was not formally included in Islamic law, the Sharia recognizes customs that prevailed at the time of Muhammad but were not abrogated by the Qur'an or the Sunnah (called "Divine silence"). Practices later innovated are also justified, since Islamic tradition says what the people, in general, consider good is also considered as such by Allah (see God in Islam).

If it is in absolute opposition to Islamic texts, custom is disregarded. Jurists also tend to, with caution, give precedence to custom over doctoral opinions of highly esteemed scholars.
Example
In some countries such as Egypt, marriage, the  way, refers to a form of common law marriage that does not involve obtaining official papers issued by the state. The validity of this type of marriage is still under debate.

See also
 Ma'ruf
 Adat
 Sources of Islamic law
 List of Islamic terms in Arabic

References

Bibliography

Libson, G.; Stewart, F.H. "ʿUrf." Encyclopaedia of Islam. Edited by: P. Bearman, Th. Bianquis, C.E. Bosworth, E. van Donzel and W.P. Heinrichs. Brill, 2008. Brill Online.  10 April 2008

Arabic words and phrases in Sharia
Islamic terminology
Marriage in Islam
Common-law marriage
Islamic jurisprudence